Me and Him is a 1988 comedy film. It depicts a man whose penis develops a mind of its own and starts telling him what to do, often to the point where people think that he's crazy.

It is a remake of the Italian film Io e lui (1973).

Cast
Griffin Dunne as Bert Uttanzi
Ellen Greene as Annette Uttanzi
Kelly Bishop as Eleanor Aramis
Carey Lowell as Janet Anderson
David Alan Grier as Peter Conklin
Craig T. Nelson as Peter Aramis
Mark Linn-Baker as "Him"
Kim Flowers as Corazon
Bill Raymond as Humphrey
Rocco Sisto as Art Strong
Robert LaSardo as Tony
Jodie Markell as Eileen
Reg E. Cathey as Waiter
Samuel E. Wright as Paramedic
Alison Fraser as Dancing Secretary
Charlayne Woodard as Dancing Secretary
Lillias White as Dancing Secretary

Reception
The film was number one in Germany for seven consecutive weeks.

References

External links
 
 
 

1988 films
1988 comedy films
German comedy films
West German films
Films based on works by Alberto Moravia
Films produced by Bernd Eichinger
Films scored by Klaus Doldinger
Columbia Pictures films
English-language German films
Films set in New York City
Remakes of Italian films
American remakes of Italian films
1989 comedy films
1989 films
1980s English-language films
1980s German films